Getting Away With Murder: Murders from 1982 to 1995, commonly referred to as GAWM, is a compilation album released in 1995 by Leaether Strip. It collects various rare and unreleased material.

Track listing
 Tears of Stone (Confinement Tour Intro)
 No Rest for the Wicked (No Vox Version)
 Dreaming (Two Track Demo 1982)
 Never Trust Anyone at the Carnival (Two Track Demo 1984)
 Satanic Citizen
 Touchdown Breakdown
 Crash (Flight 232)
 Zyclon B
 Leæther Strip Part II
 Murder

Leæther Strip compilation albums
1995 compilation albums
Zoth Ommog Records compilation albums